Coral Drouyn née O'Neill, (born in Doncaster, England in 1945), also billed as Coral Kelly, is an English Australian actress, singer and screenwriter/story editor best known for her work in television, including Prisoner, Neighbours, Blue Heelers, Pacific Drive and Home and Away

Biography

Drouyn was born in Doncaster, South Yorkshire, to Terry O,Neill who was born Terry Norris in Ireland in 1922, who was an actor and son of an Irish tenor, her matarnel uncle was the British actor Jack Haig and her maternal grandparents where Charles Coppin and Bertha Baker, who  where both music hall performers billed as "Haig and Esco". Drouyn emigrated to Australia in the 1960s, where she wrote comedy for her father's Melbourne-based program "Time for Terry" and worked as a singer, whilst writing material for theatre restaurants. 

At the age of four, she appeared in an uncredited role as "Precocious Child in I Was a Male War Bride, During her acting career, when she was often billed as Coral Kelly,she featured in the ill-fated TV soap opera Arcade as health studio receptionist Consuela McPhee.

Retiring from acting, Drouyn began writing for television, working as a scriptwriter for Grundy Productions series such as The Restless Years, Prisoner and Neighbours. During her time on Prisoner, Drouyn worked her way up from freelance writer to in-house story editor, creating characters and stories before leaving the series prior to its 600th episode.

Drouyn subsequently was involved in the creation of serial Pacific Drive before performing story editor duties on Blue Heelers and Home and Away''.

Her book 'Big Screen, Small Screen', detailing the craft skills involved in screen-writing, was published in 1994.

Drouyn now works as a theatre critic.

Select credits

References

External links

Australian women screenwriters
Living people
English people of Irish descent
1945 births
Australian soap opera writers
Women soap opera writers
Australian women television writers